Proceso a la infamia aka Los Años Infames is a 1974 Argentine historical drama film directed by Alejandro Doria, set in the period that followed the Great Depression in Argentina, known as the "Infamous Decade".

External links
 

Argentine drama films
1970s Spanish-language films
Films set in the Infamous Decade
Films set in Buenos Aires
Films directed by Alejandro Doria
1970s Argentine films